Bluey (7 June 1910 – 14 November 1939) was a female Australian Cattle Dog owned by Les and Esma Hall of Rochester, Victoria. She previously held the record as the oldest dog to ever live, until being surpassed by Bobi from Portugal. Bobi was announced by Guinness World Records on 1 February 2023 to be the oldest dog ever, aged 30 years and 266 days, surpassing Bluey and breaking the over 83-year-old record.

Longevity
According to Guinness World Records, Bluey (1910–1939) lived to 29 years, 5 months before being euthanised. At that time she was the oldest lived dog ever verified.  

Three owners had also made claims for longer-lived dogs—Max, Maggie, and Bella—however these claims have not been independently verified.

Bluey's age, along with that of "Chilla", a Labrador Retriever and Australian Cattle Dog mix reported to have lived to the age of 32 years and 12 days, prompted a study of the longevity of the Australian Cattle Dog to examine if the breed might have exceptional longevity. The 100-dog survey yielded a mean longevity of 13.41 years with a standard deviation of 2.36 years. 

The study concluding that while Australian Cattle Dogs do live almost a year longer than most dogs of other breeds in the same weight class on average, the cases of both Bluey and Chilla should be regarded as uncharacteristic exceptions rather than as indicators of common longevity across this entire breed.

See also
 List of longest living dogs
 List of individual dogs
 Creme Puff, the longest-lived cat
 Bobi, the longest-lived dog

Notes

References

 2004 Guinness Book of World Records

1910 animal births
1939 animal deaths
Individual dogs
Animal deaths by euthanasia
Oldest animals